James Mellaart FBA (14 November 1925 – 29 July 2012) was an English archaeologist and author who is noted for his discovery of the Neolithic settlement of Çatalhöyük in Turkey. He was expelled from Turkey when he was suspected of involvement with the antiquities black market. He was also involved in a string of controversies, including the so-called mother goddess controversy in Anatolia, which eventually led to his being banned from excavations in Turkey in the 1960s. After his death it was discovered that he had forged many of his "finds", including murals and inscriptions used to discover the Çatalhöyük site.

Biography
Mellaart was born in 1925 in London. He lectured at the University of Istanbul and was an assistant director of the British Institute of Archaeology at Ankara (BIAA). In 1951 Mellaart began to direct excavations on the sites in Turkey with the assistance of his Turkish-born wife Arlette, who was the secretary of BIAA. He helped to identify the "champagne-glass" pottery of western Anatolia in the Late Bronze Age, which in 1954 led to the discovery of Beycesultan. After that expedition's completion in 1959, he helped to publish its results. In 1964 he began to lecture in Anatolian archaeology in Ankara.

Çatalhöyük excavation

When Mellaart excavated the Çatalhöyük site in 1961, his team found more than 150 rooms and buildings, some decorated with murals, plaster reliefs, and sculptures. The site has since been seen as important as it has helped in the study of the social and cultural dynamics of one of the earliest and largest permanently occupied farming settlements in the Near East.

According to one of Mellaart's theories, Çatalhöyük was a prominent place of mother goddess worship. However, many other archaeologists did not agree with him, and the dispute created a controversy. Mellaart was even accused of making up at least some of the mythological stories he presented as genuine. The furor caused the Turkish government to close up the site. The site was unattended for the next 30 years until excavations were begun anew in the 1990s.

The city as a whole covers roughly 32.5 acres (130,000 m²), and housed 5,000–8,000 people, whereas the norm for the time was around one tenth of this size. The site stirred great excitement when Mellaart announced it and has since caused much head scratching. In fact, more recent work has turned up comparable features at other early Neolithic sites in the Near East, and this has benefited many people in their understanding of the site so that many of its one-time mysteries are no longer real issues.

Dorak affair

In 1965 Mellaart gave a report of a new rich find from Dorak to Seton Lloyd of the British Institute. Mellaart said that he had seen the treasures in 1958 in the Izmir home of a young woman whom he met on a train. She sat in front of him in the train car, wearing a gold bracelet which drew his attention. She told him that she had more at home, so he came over and saw the collection. She did not allow him to take photographs, but did let him make drawings of them. He gave the story to The Illustrated London News, and then Turkish authorities demanded to know why they had not been informed. He said that the young woman, named Anna Papastrati, asked him to keep it secret.
He asked the Institution to sponsor publications of the story, but they refused with no real evidence. When looking for Papastrati's home, it turned out that the street address did not exist in Izmir, and her name was not found. The only document that can be traced to her is a typed letter that after examination appears to have been done by Mellaart's wife Arlette. In consequence, Turkish officials expelled Mellaart for suspected antiquities smuggling. He was later allowed to return but later banned completely.

Retirement
As of 2005, Mellaart had retired from teaching and lived in North London with his wife and grandson.  He died on 29 July 2012.

Theories about early Anatolia
According to Mellaart, the earliest Indo-Europeans in northwest Anatolia were the horse-riders who came to this region from the north and founded Demircihöyük in Eskişehir Province, Turkey, in ancient Phrygia, c. 3000 BCE. They were ancestors of the Luwians who inhabited Troy II, and spread widely in the Anatolian peninsula. It was Mellaart who first introduced the term "Luwian" to archaeological discourse in the 1950s. According to Christoph Bachhuber, current surveys and excavations tend to support many of Mellaart’s observations on changes in material culture at a regional scale.

Mellaart cited the distribution of a new type of wheel-made pottery, Red Slip Wares, as some of the best evidence for his theory. According to Mellaart, the proto-Luwian migrations to Anatolia came in several distinct waves over many centuries. The current trend is to see such migrations as mostly peaceful, rather than military conquests. Mellaart focused on the archaeologically observable destruction events of Troy II (ca. 2600–2400 BCE). For him, they were associated with the arrival of Indo-Europeans from the eastern Balkans.

Forgeries
In 2018 Mellaart's son Alan and the Swiss-German geoarchaeologist Eberhard Zangger published an investigation according to which Mellaart had fabricated extensive forgeries in support of his theses. After investigating the late Mellaart's apartment, Zangger revealed that Mellaart "faked several of the ancient murals and may have run a 'forger's workshop' of sorts." These forgeries included prototypes of murals and engravings that Mellaart had claimed to have discovered in Çatalhöyük.

Beyköy 2 inscription
Another of Mellaart's texts was a Hieroglyphic Luwian inscription named Beyköy 2, which received global headlines when it was announced in 2017 because it purported to contain specific history of the groups known to the Egyptians as Sea Peoples and to the biblical authors as the Philistines. This text, however, may also be a forgery, and several scholars have since debated its authenticity. Zangger and Fred Woudhuizen, who published the text after discovering drawings of it (held to be copies of drawings made by Georges Perrot in 1878 of stone blocks that later disappeared) among Mellaart's papers, have contended for its authenticity, but other scholars consider the inscription spurious, pointing out that it fits the pattern of Mellaart's previous forgeries but does not fit what is otherwise known about the history of the period.

Works
"Anatolian Chronology in the Early and Middle Bronze Age" ; Anatolian Studies VII, 1957
"Early Cultures of the South Anatolian Plateau. The Late Chalcolithic and Early Bronze Ages in the Konya Plain"; Anatolian Studies XIII, 1963
Çatal Höyük, A Neolithic Town in Anatolia, London, 1967
Excavatians at Hacilar, vols. I–II, Edinburgh, 1970
The Goddess from Anatolia, 1989 (with Udo Hirsch and Belkıs Balpınar)

See also
 Matriarchy
 Potnia Theron
 Religion in prehistory
 Slow Train to Izmir
 Venus figurines
Middle Bronze Age migrations (ancient Near East)
Archaeological forgery

References

Further reading
 Balter, Michael. The Goddess and the Bull: Çatalhöyük: An Archaeological Journey to the Dawn of Civilization. New York: Free Press, 2004 (hardcover); Walnut Creek, CA: Left Coast Press, 2006 (paperback).
 Pearson, Kenneth; Connor, Patricia. The Dorak Affair. London: Michael Joseph. 1967; New York: Atheneum, 1968.

External links

 Mazur, Susan. "The Dorak Affair's Final Chapter", at Scoop.co.nz, October 10, 2005.
 The Blog of Matt Salusbury, "The Dorak Affair, an archaeological mystery," a February 8, 2010 post

1925 births
2012 deaths
British archaeologists
Fellows of the British Academy
Matriarchy
Christian feminist theologians
British feminists
Male feminists
Archaeological forgery